James Aaron Kellermann (born 11 December 1995) is an English footballer who plays for Woking, as a midfielder.

Career

Aldershot Town
Kellermann spent his early career with Kidderminster Lions and Stourport Swifts before signing for Wolverhampton Wanderers at the age of 14. Following his release from Wolves he signed for Aldershot Town.

St Mirren
James signed a two-year contract with Scottish club St Mirren in May 2018. He made his debut for St Mirren on 13 July 2018 in the Scottish League Cup. He moved on loan to AFC Fylde in August 2018. He left St Mirren by mutual consent on 29 October 2019.

Kidderminster Harriers
In March 2020 he signed for Kidderminster Harriers. He was released at the end of the 2020–21 season.

Chesterfield
In August 2021 he signed for National League side Chesterfield.

On 17 August 2021, James moved on loan to Southern League Premier Division Central side Tamworth.

Kellermann made his debut for Tamworth in a Southern League Premier Division Central fixture on 17 August 2021 at home to Coalville Town; he played up until the 93rd minute, when he was substituted for defender Tom Ward, the match finished 1-1.

He scored his first goal for the club in the next Southern League Premier Division Central fixture at home to Lowestoft Town on 21 August 2021. Kellermann scored the first goal of a 6-1 victory.

Chesterfield exercised their option to recall Kellermann from his loan on 28 September 2021. He made six appearances and scored two goals during his spell with Tamworth.

Kellerman was offered a new contract at the end of the 2021–22 season, however was unable to agree terms with the club. He then signed for Woking in July 2022.

Career statistics

References

1995 births
Living people
English footballers
Stourport Swifts F.C. players
Wolverhampton Wanderers F.C. players
Aldershot Town F.C. players
St Mirren F.C. players
AFC Fylde players
Kidderminster Harriers F.C. players
Chesterfield F.C. players
Tamworth F.C. players
Woking F.C. players
Association football midfielders
Scottish Professional Football League players
National League (English football) players
Southern Football League players